Translational Behavioral Medicine is a quarterly peer-reviewed medical journal covering behavioral medicine. It is one of two official journals of the Society of Behavioral Medicine.  The journal was launched in 2011 by founding editor and editor in-chief, Bonnie Spring (Northwestern University Feinberg School of Medicine) with a team of field editors (Sherry Pagoto, Rodger Kessler, Brian Oldenburg, and Frank Keefe).  By 2016, Translational Behavioral Medicine had been indexed in PubMed, MEDLINE, and Thompson Reuters, and earned its first impact factor.   The journal was originally published by Springer Science+Business Media until January 1, 2018. Since then, it has been published by Oxford University Press. The current editor-in-chief is Cheryl L. Knott (University of Maryland). According to the Journal Citation Reports, the journal has a 2021 impact factor of 3.626.

References

External links

Translational medicine
Behavioral medicine journals
Oxford University Press academic journals
Springer Science+Business Media academic journals
English-language journals
Quarterly journals
Publications established in 2011